World Chess Championship 1910 may refer to:
 
World Chess Championship 1910 (Lasker–Schlechter)
World Chess Championship 1910 (Lasker–Janowski)